Denis Metlyuk (born January 30, 1972) is a former Russian professional ice hockey player who played in the Russian Superleague (RSL). Metlyuk was drafted in the second round of the 1992 NHL Entry Draft by the Philadelphia Flyers and played parts of two seasons in North America for the Hershey Bears, the Flyers' AHL affiliate at the time. He played 14 seasons in the RSL for HC Lada Togliatti, Ak Bars Kazan, Salavat Yulaev Ufa, HC Neftekhimik Nizhnekamsk, and HC Khimik Voskresensk. He is the brother of Filipp Metlyuk.

References

External links

1972 births
Living people
Ak Bars Kazan players
HC Khimik Voskresensk players
HC Lada Togliatti players
HC Neftekhimik Nizhnekamsk players
Hershey Bears players
Sportspeople from Tolyatti
Philadelphia Flyers draft picks
Russian ice hockey left wingers
Salavat Yulaev Ufa players